The Stony Hill School is a historic school building at 1195 Windsor Avenue in Windsor, Connecticut.  Built in 1856 and extensively altered after a move in 1899, it is a good example of a Colonial Revival district schoolhouse built out of brick.  It was listed on the National Register of Historic Places in 1988.

Description and history
The Stony Hill School is located in southern Windsor, on the west side of Windsor Avenue (Connecticut Route 159) just north of its junction with Hillcrest Road.  It is a single-story masonry structure, with a rectangular main block and projecting entry vestibule, each covered by a gabled roof.  The gable ends are framed in wood and finished in shingles, and have returns at the base.   The entry projection is symmetrical, with two small square fixed-pane windows flanking an arched entrance with transom window.  Windows are otherwise set in rectangular openings, with cut brownstone sills and slightly splayed headers made of soldier bricks.  A wood-frame addition to the rear of the building provides space originally used as an outhouse.

The school was built in 1856 to a simpler plan, and was originally located across the street.  In 1899, Doctor Evastus Case traded with the town, giving them this parcel in exchange for the one on which it stood.  At that time the building underwent major alterations, giving it its present form.  It is relatively little altered since that time, and is an good example of Colonial Revival architecture.

See also
National Register of Historic Places listings in Windsor, Connecticut

References

School buildings on the National Register of Historic Places in Connecticut
National Register of Historic Places in Hartford County, Connecticut
Colonial Revival architecture in Connecticut
School buildings completed in 1856
Windsor, Connecticut